Baakleen or Baakline is a major Druze town located in Mount Lebanon, Chouf District, 45 kilometers southeast of Beirut. Altitude 850 – 920 meters high, population is 30,000, area 14 square km, number of homes 2,870. Bordering Towns: Deir El Qamar, Beit Eddine, Aynbal, Deir Dourit, Symkanieh, and Jahlieh.

History
Founded in the 12th century by the Maan emirs, Baakline served as their capital until the early 17th century when its most famous Emir Fakhreddin II, moved to Deir el Qamar. Today, Baakline is an important Druze town and seat of the sect's religious leader. The beautiful grand serail, the main administrative building of Baakline before World War II, has been restored and transformed into a public library. In the area of the Serail are some Druze religious buildings of the 18th and 19th centuries, including, ancient tombs and Ain Aldiaa water source.

The roots of Lebanon as we know it today go back to Baakline.  Around the year 1120 A.D., Amir Maan Ibn Rabeaah, the great grandfather of Amir Fakher Eddine Al Maani the second who established “Lubnan Al Kabeer”, settled in Baakleen. He was supported by his in-laws, the Tanoukhyeen. Amir Maan was married to the daughter of Amir Noaaman Al Tanoukhy. Historians agree that Baakleen was the capital of the Maani Emirate.

Due to water shortages in Baakline, the Maani Amirs were attracted to Neighboring Deir Al Kamar (according to Druze archives, called Dar Al Kamar), where they built many palaces and a mosque that still stands in the middle of the town square carrying the name of Amir Fakher Eddine Ibn Othman Ibn Al Hajj Younis Al Maani (1493 AD).
The last of the Maan family Amirs was Amir Ahmad who died in 1697 A.D. and with his death, the rulers of the Emirate became the Shihab family who were tied to the Maan family through intermarriages and alliances.

Under the Ottoman rule, Baakline came back to the forefront as one of the “Qasabat” or major towns. It served as the summer capital for the Druze “Qaem Makqam” or the local governor in the name of the Ottoman Sultan.

On 21 April 2020, nine people were killed.

Waterfalls and river

Blue waterfalls of Shallalat el Zarka 
The blue waterfall is called Shallalat Al Zarka, by which the restaurant in this place holds the same name.

One can also see other magnificent waterfall and river in the village of Baakline.

References

External links
 Baaqline, Localiban 

Populated places in Chouf District
Druze communities in Lebanon